Khabarov (masculine) or Khabarova (feminine), also transliterated as Habarov, is a Russian surname. Notable people with the surname include:

Boris Khabarov (born 1934), Soviet sailor
Bruno Khabarov (1939–1994), Latvian-Soviet fencer
Irina Khabarova (born 1966), Russian sprinter
Ivan Khabarov (1888–1960), Soviet army commander
Leonid Khabarov (born 1947), Soviet military officer
Mikhail Khabarov (born 1971), Russian businessman
Sergei Khabarov (born 1986), Russian footballer
Vladimir Khabarov (1951–2010), was a Russian politician
Yaroslav Khabarov (born 1989), Russian ice hockey player
Yerofey Khabarov ( 1603–1671), Russian entrepreneur and adventurer

Russian-language surnames